Kimia is an Ancient Greek word and a feminine given name in Persian language. It means elixir of life, alchemy, or the philosopher’s stone.
 In ancient Persian poetry, kimia means "rare" or "unique." 

The ultimate origin of the  word is uncertain.
According to the Oxford English Dictionary, it may be derived from the greek , which is derived from the ancient Egyptian name of Egypt, khem or khm, khame, or khmi, meaning "blackness", i.e., the rich dark soil of the Nile river valley. Therefore, alchemy can be seen as the "Egyptian art" or the "black art".

Alchemy is a philosophical and protoscientific tradition practiced throughout Europe, Africa, and Asia. It aims to purify, mature, and perfect certain objects. Latin words for Chemistry are derived from the Ancient Greek word χημία (kimia.)

The meaning of Kimia, in the Persian literature refers to what is behind the ‘materialistic’ conception of alchemy, and instead to the secret of the spirit’s action in nature and the Universe, the macro-cosmos. By acquiring this secular wisdom of action, alchemists aspired to discover their inner (microcosmic) reality, and transmute themselves.

The word appears ubiquitously in Persian literature. Some early usages can be seen in Vis and Ramin and Ferdowsi’s Shahnameh. 

Other samples in verse and prose are:

The word Kimia has been frequently been used in other Persian poetry, including those of Hafez Shirazi:

or

Notable persons
 Kimia Alizadeh (born 1998), Iranian Olympian athlete and taekwondo player
Kimia Hosseini (born 2003), Iranian actress
 (born 1970), Japanese astronaut
 (born 1989), Japanese racing driver

References